The Repealing and Amending (Second) Act, 2017 is an Act of the Parliament of India that repealed 131 Acts, and also repealed nine Ordinances promulgated by the Governor-General of India before independence. It also made minor amendments to The Plantations Labour Act, 1951, The Juvenile Justice (Care and Protection of Children) Act, 2015, and The Rights of Persons with Disabilities Act, 2016. The Act was the fifth such repealing act tabled by the Narendra Modi administration aimed at repealing obsolete laws.

Background and legislative history
Prime Minister Narendra Modi advocated the repeal of old laws during his 2014 general election campaign. At the 2015 Economic Times Global Business Summit, Modi stated, "Our country suffers from an excess of old and unnecessary laws which obstruct people and businesses. We began the exercise of identifying unnecessary laws and repealing them. 1,877 Central laws have been identified for repeal."

The Repealing and Amending (Second) Bill, 2017  was introduced in the Lok Sabha on 11 August 2017 by the Minister of Law and Justice, Ravi Shankar Prasad. The bill sought to repeal 131 Acts, including over 30 Acts enacted before independence, and also sought to repeal 9 Ordinances promulgated by the Governor General of India before independence. It also sought to make minor amendments to delete some provisions, and rectify drafting errors in The Plantations Labour Act, 1951, The Juvenile Justice (Care and Protection of Children) Act, 2015, and The Rights of Persons with Disabilities Act, 2016.

The bill was passed by the Lok Sabha on 19 December 2017 and by the Rajya Sabha on 28 December 2017. The bill received assent from President Ram Nath Kovind on 5 January 2018, and was notified in The Gazette of India on 8 January 2018.

Repealed Acts
The 131 Acts included in the bill's First Schedule were completely repealed.

See also 
 List of legislations repealed under Modi government

References

Law of India
Acts of the Parliament of India 2017
Modi administration
2018 in law
2018 in India
Repealed Indian legislation